Frasdorf is a municipality in the district of Rosenheim in Bavaria in Germany.

References

External links
 Municipality website

Rosenheim (district)